Corinda railway station is located on the Main line in Queensland, Australia. It serves the Brisbane suburb of Corinda.

History
Corinda station opened in 1875 as South Brisbane Junction, being renamed Corinda in 1888. In 1884, a branch line was built from Corinda to the South Brisbane wharves. The branch line is now known as the Corinda-Yeerongpilly line.

The station was rebuilt in 1960 as part of the quadruplication of the line from Roma Street. In 2010, the quadruplication was extended to Darra as part of the construction of the Springfield line.

Services
Corinda is served by City network services operating from Nambour, Caboolture, Kippa-Ring and Bowen Hills to Springfield Central, Ipswich and Rosewood.

During peak hours, trains ran between Central and Corinda via Tennyson, Yeerongpilly and the Corinda-Yeerongpilly line until replaced by Brisbane Transport's route 104 in June 2011.

Corinda is also served by Queensland Rail Travel's twice weekly Westlander service travelling between Brisbane and Charleville.

Services by platform

*Note: One weekday morning service (4:56am from Central) and selected afternoon peak services continue through to Rosewood.  At all other times, a change of train is required at Ipswich.

Transport links
Corinda station is served by Brisbane Transport's route 104 to Princess Alexandra Hospital.

References

External links

Corinda station Queensland Rail
Corinda station Queensland's Railways on the Internet
[ Corinda station] TransLink travel information

Corinda, Queensland
Railway stations in Brisbane
Railway stations in Australia opened in 1875
Main Line railway, Queensland